Greenwood Branch is a  tributary of the North Branch Rancocas Creek in the southern New Jersey Pine Barrens in the United States.

Greenwood Branch, born of the confluence of Mount Misery Brook and Pole Bridge Branch, ends at the North Branch Rancocas Creek just below New Lisbon.

Tributaries
 Mount Misery Brook
 Pole Bridge Branch
 Bisphams Mill Creek

See also
 List of rivers of New Jersey

References

External links
 U.S. Geological Survey: NJ stream gaging stations

Rivers in the Pine Barrens (New Jersey)
Rivers of New Jersey
Tributaries of Rancocas Creek
Rivers of Burlington County, New Jersey